Billy Hebert Field is a stadium in Stockton, California.  It is used primarily for baseball and was the home field of the Stockton Ports until they moved to Banner Island Ballpark in 2005. The stadium continues to be used as a venue for high school baseball playoffs. It also has been used as a practice facility for the Stockton Lightning minor Arena League football team.  The ballpark has a capacity of 6,000 people and opened in 1953.  Prior to 1953, the land upon which the field is built was used for baseball since the late 19th century.  In 1927, Oak Park Field was constructed.  After the field's grandstand was destroyed by fire for a second time, the modern-day grandstand was built in 1953.  The field is named for Billy Hebert, the first professional baseball player to die in World War II.

External links
Billy Hebert Field Views - Ball Parks of the Minor Leagues

References

Minor league baseball venues
Baseball in Stockton, California
Baseball venues in California
1953 establishments in California
Sports venues completed in 1953